Mohammad Hossein Dadkan محمد حسين دادکان (born 2 February 1956) is an Iranian former football player who spent most of his playing career with Persepolis FC. He served as President of the Islamic Republic of Iran Football Federation from April 2002 until April 2006.

Early life
He was born on 2 February 1956 in Tehran, Iran. His family was from Tehran. He graduated in Phd from Tarbiat Modarres University  in 1980.

Footballing career

Club career
He started his footballing career in the now dissolved Bootan F.C. in Iran. Before long he moved to Persepolis F.C., one of the two Iranian powerhouses, and spent 8 years playing for Persepolis. He hung his boots at 27 and ended his career playing for Persepolis F.C.

International career
He was invited to the national team in 1978. He made his debut in a match against Germany. He played his last national match during the 1982 Asian Games and retired from international matches after that tournament.

Honours

Club 
Persepolis
Iranian Football League (1): 1975-76
Runner-up: 1976-77, 1977-78
Espandi Cup: 1979
Tehran Provincial League (1): 1982-83
Tehran Hazfi Cup (1): 1981-82

IRIFF career
In 2002 Mohsen Safaei Farahani, the President of IRIFF at the time, appointed Dadgan as the head of Iran's Premier Football League (IPL). Later on Dadgan became Farahni's assistant as well. But the alliance didn't last, and before long Dadgan started criticizing his boss publicly. This was a surprise as Farahani still remains one of the best, most creative and devoted IRIFF Presidents to this date. Mohsen Farahani resigned from his position after Iranian national team failed to reach the World Cup Finals which was held in Korea and Japan in 2002. Dadgan took the position and promised to refine all those things that he thought were wrong.

Controversies
At the start of his presidency Dadgan sacked Branko Ivanković, the manager of the Iranian national football team, and replaced him with his close friend Homayoon Shahrokhi. The decision came as huge surprise to both fans and critics since Shahrokhi's coaching career is not a respectable one and managing the national team was and still is way out of his league. But Dadgan insisted that he has made the right choice, but the results showed something else. The national team lost at home to Jordan and came very close to being eliminated from 2006 FIFA World Cup (qualification) in the very first round. Dadgan was forced to bring back Branko Ivanković, but didn't sack Shahrokhi. Instead, he appointed Shahrokhi as Directing Manager of national team, a title that never existed before. This is among many controversial decisions that Dadgan has made. In fact, forcing the former manager in the new manager's coaching staff has never happened before in history of football.

During Iran's World Cup qualification campaign, Dadgan almost showed up at Team Melli's every training session and went along with them to all away games in foreign countries. This has raised many questions about his interference with coaching. The fact that Ivanković's team still plays a lot like Shahrokhi's team, very defensive and cautious, added to the controversy about Dadgan and Shahrokhi's interference with Branko Ivanković's decisions. Ivanković has never complained so far.

But Dadgan's darkest time came at the start of season 2005–2006, when Rah Ahan FC, one of the teams who were promoted to IPL from lower division used false documents on one of their players. According to the IRIFF's laws, the team who uses false documents is known guilty and the results in all the games that they used that player should change to 3–0 to the opponent. By applying this rule Rah Ahan FC should have remained in lower division and Sanat Naft FC should have been promoted. But after a long weeks of debate behind closed doors at IRIFF, the disciplinary committee announced that Rah Ahan FC is guilty, however they will be promoted to IPL. Later, one of the members of the committee revealed that Dadgan had been putting pressure on the committee to keep Rah Ahan FC in the IPL. There were many other incidents when IRIFF simply didn't apply the rules, especially when the decisions involved one of few rich and powerful teams in the IPL. Dadgan's involvement in these cases is undeniable.

Mohammad Dadgan was fired after Iran's third and final game of their World Cup 2006 campaign. A majority vote by IRIFF officials terminated him from his position.  It was the involvement of the government run Physical Education organisation  that lead to Iran's suspension from international football by FIFA on 22 November 2006.

References

Presidents of Iranian Football Federation

1956 births
Living people
Iranian footballers
Presidents of Iranian Football Federation
Persepolis F.C. players
Iran international footballers
Islamic Coalition Party politicians
Iranian sportsperson-politicians
Association football defenders